Jorge Eduardo García (born August 18, 2002) is a Mexican child actor.

Filmography

Awards and nominations

References

External links 

2002 births
21st-century Mexican male actors
Mexican male telenovela actors
Male actors from Mexico City
Living people
Mexican male child actors